Renens VD railway station is a railway and metro station in Renens, Vaud, Switzerland, west of the city of Lausanne.  It is served by trains of the Swiss Federal Railways (SBB) on the Lausanne–Geneva railway and the M1 metro line in Lausanne (also called TSOL). It is one of the termini of the Lausanne Metro system.

Layout and connections
Renens VD has three island platforms and one side platform. A single island platform serves the Lausanne Metro with two tracks ( 61–62) which terminate at the station. The remaining platforms serve five main-line tracks (Nos. 1–5). Transports publics de la région lausannoise operates bus services from the station.

Services
 the following services call at Renens VD:
 RegioExpress:
 single daily round-trip to St-Maurice.
 RER Vaud:

Gallery

References

External links 
 
 

Transport in Lausanne
Railway stations in the canton of Vaud
Swiss Federal Railways stations
Railway stations in Switzerland opened in 1855